The Psalms: frae Hebrew intil Scottis is a translation of the book of Psalms into Scots by Peter Hately Waddell, first published in 1871. It is notable for being the first translation into Scots from an original biblical language, rather than from a pre-existing English translation.

Sample text 
PSALM XXIII

  :

  

External links 
The Psalms: Frae hebrew intil Scottis at archive.org

References 

1870s books
Bible versions and translations
Scots language